Boreaphilus is a genus of beetles belonging to the family Staphylinidae.

The species of this genus are found in Europe, Russia, Japan and Northern America.

Species:
 Boreaphilus albanicus Zerche, 1990 
 Boreaphilus astur Sharp, 1873

References

Staphylinidae
Staphylinidae genera